Porcus may refer to:

Porcus, a cognomen in Ancient Rome;  see List of Roman cognomina
Porcus, a genus of fish now known as Bagrus
porcus, a specific name often used in the family Suidae

See also
Porcu (disambiguation)